Bill Gut is a minor,  long river (brook) and drainage ditch in the Pevensey Levels in Pevensey, Wealden District, East Sussex, England. Forming multiple tributaries, it rises from Langley Sewer and ultimately flows into Salt Haven—as does Langley Sewer.

Etymology 
According to the Survey of English Place-Names, Bill Gut was known as la bylle in 1527, le greate Bill marshe in 1617 and Bill Streaks in 1840.

References 

Rivers of East Sussex
Rivers of the Pevensey Levels